Washington Fernando Camacho (born 8 April 1986) is a Uruguayan footballer currently playing for Defensa y Justicia in Argentina. Besides Uruguay, he has played in Argentina and Mexico.

Honours
Rosario Central
Copa Argentina: 2017–18

References

External links
 
 Profile at Tenfield Digital 

1986 births
Living people
Uruguayan footballers
Association football defenders
C.A. Rentistas players
C.A. Bella Vista players
Juventud de Las Piedras players
El Tanque Sisley players
C.A. Cerro players
Godoy Cruz Antonio Tomba footballers
Defensa y Justicia footballers
Racing Club de Avellaneda footballers
Rosario Central footballers
Club Tijuana footballers
Uruguayan Primera División players
Argentine Primera División players
Primera Nacional players
Liga MX players
Uruguayan expatriate footballers
Uruguayan expatriate sportspeople in Argentina
Uruguayan expatriate sportspeople in Mexico
Expatriate footballers in Argentina
Expatriate footballers in Mexico